The Head of the Security Service of Ukraine serves as the director of the Security Service of Ukraine (SBU), the internal security agency of the Ukrainian government. The head of the Security Service of Ukraine is ex officio a member of the National Security and Defense Council of Ukraine, and is appointed or dismissed by the Verkhovna Rada (Ukraine's national parliament) on proposition of the President of Ukraine.

List of heads of the Security Service of Ukraine
 Nikolai Golushko (acting), September 20, 1991 – November 6, 1991
 Yevhen Marchuk, November 6, 1991 – July 12, 1994
 Valeriy Malikov, July 12, 1994 – July 3, 1995
 Volodymyr Radchenko, July 3, 1995 – April 22, 1998
 Leonid Derkach, April 22, 1998 – February 10, 2001
 Volodymyr Radchenko, February 10, 2001 – September 2, 2003
 Ihor Smeshko, September 4, 2003 – February 4, 2005
 Oleksandr Turchynov, February 4, 2005 – September 8, 2005
 Ihor Drizhchany, September 8, 2005 – December 22, 2006
 Valentyn Nalyvaichenko December 22, 2006 – March 6, 2009
 Valentyn Nalyvaichenko, March 6, 2009 – March 11, 2010
 Valeriy Khoroshkovsky, March 11, 2010 – January 18, 2012.
 Volodymyr Rokytsky (acting), January 19, 2012 – February 3, 2012
 Ihor Kalinin, February 3, 2012 – January 9, 2013
 Oleksandr Yakymenko, January 9, 2013 – February 24, 2014
 Valentyn Nalyvaichenko, February 24, 2014 – June 18, 2015
 Vasyl Hrytsak, July 2, 2015 – May 22, 2019
 Ivan Bakanov, August 29, 2019 – July 17, 2022
 Vasyl Malyuk, February 7, 2023 – present (acting head from July 17, 2022 to February 7, 2023)

References

Government of Ukraine
 
1991 establishments in Ukraine
Ukraine
National Security and Defense Council of Ukraine